Thingyan Moe is a 1985 Burmese film directed by Maung Tin Oo and starring Nay Aung, Zin Wine, Khin Than Nu and May Than Nu. The movie follows the life of a musician from 1959 to 1982, with many of the scenes set at traditional Thingyan celebrations.

Plot
The story begins with poor pianist Nyein Maung, and wealthy teenage girl in Mandalay, Khin Khin Htar, falling in love. Htar asks Nyein Maung to elope but he is forced to go to his sick mother instead. In his absence, Htar is brought back by her mother and forced to accept an arranged marriage. Htar asks Nyein Maung to play the song 'Nat Ko To Chit tha mya' at her wedding ceremony. After Htar's wedding ceremony, Neing Maung drinks too much alcohol, falls asleep, dreams about Htar giving money to him, and thinks that Htar left him because of money. After several months, Nyein Maung marries Mya Khet, and the movie turns into studio musical.

Cast
Nay Aung as Nyein Maung
Zin Wine as Thet Htway
Khin Than Nu as Khin Khin Htar
May Than Nu as 
Thida Theint as Mya Khet
Zaw One as Ko Latt
Mandalay Citizen.

Shooting and overview
The film was produced by Yee Myint Film Production and won the Thurya Pya Film Award at the Filmfare Awards. Yee Myint Films had to buy films from the government in the name of licensed film companies because it was not possible to buy foreign films due to the government's economic policy at the time.

The filming took place at the Ye Myint Film Building in Mandalay's Sai Tan Ward and at Dr. Thein Aung Temple in Pwe Kone, and the piano was filmed inside Nyein Maung's house at Sein Maung Studio in Rangoon.

The words "Kyawan Taw of the women" in the film were censored.

Awards
 1985 Myanmar Motion Picture Academy Awards
 Best Picture : Thuriya Pyinnya Films
 Best Director : Maung Tin Oo
 Best Cinematography : Chit Min Lu

References

External links
 

1985 films
Burmese drama films
1985 drama films